Trempealeau Morninglight (September 14, 2001 – July 22, 2016) was a junior competitive skier.

He was born in Taos, New Mexico.  His father Brendan Curran got him into skiing at the young age of four. Morninglight excelled at the sport and went on to become a big mountain skier.

He joined the Taos Winter Sports Team when he was eight. He raced for two years, then switched to park for about two years. Starting in 2014 he competed in big mountain skiing, or free ride skiing, on the International Free Skiers Association tour. In 2015, he ended up 8th overall in North America and placed 4th in the North American Championships held at Grand Targhee Resort.

He participated with a youth organization known as Field Institute of Taos as a camper and later as a stellar youth mentor for many years. In July 2016, Morninglight committed suicide by jumping from the Rio Grande Gorge Bridge near Taos.

Since his death, Trempealeau’s mother, Heather Lynn Sparrow, a photographer, shot a series of photographs depicting his friends’ grief. The show hung at the Atrium Gallery at UNM Taos in November and December 2022.

References

2001 births
2016 deaths
2016 suicides
American male freestyle skiers
People from Taos, New Mexico
Suicides by jumping in the United States
Suicides in New Mexico
American children